, also known by his Japanese-style name , was a Ryukyuan aristocrat and bureaucrat in the royal government of the Ryūkyū Kingdom.

Sai Taku was born in Kumemura on January 4, 1645. He descended from Cai Xiang. He took part in the compilation of Rekidai Hōan, an official compilation of diplomatic documents of the royal government. In 1697, he was ordered to translate the Chūzan Seikan (中山世鑑), an official history book, into Chinese, and renamed it Chūzan Seifu (中山世譜).

Sai Taku was also known for his poetry, many of which were included in his poetry collection. He had two sons, Sai En (蔡淵) and Sai On (蔡温).

References
蔡鐸

1645 births
1725 deaths
Ryukyuan Confucianists
People of the Ryukyu Kingdom
Ryukyuan people of Chinese descent
Ueekata
17th-century Ryukyuan people
18th-century Ryukyuan people